Inception is a compilation album by American heavy metal band Sanctuary, released on February 24, 2017, through Century Media. A prequel to the band's 1988 debut album Refuge Denied, the album contains remixed and remastered lost studio recordings from 1986. This is Sanctuary's final release with vocalist Warrel Dane, who died of a heart attack on December 13, 2017.

Critical reception

Olivier Badin of Terrorizer rated the album moderately positive, and wrote, "Zeuss' careful remastering job here has leased a new sense of life to these early versions. [...] And even with a then 25-year-old Warrel Dane in pure Rob Halford mode and a very mid-'80s power/thrash style, this doesn't sound dated at all and even actually has a sense of urgency its second version lacked." He concluded, "With 'Refuge Denied' hard to get these days, it's a win-win situation."

Track listing

Personnel

Sanctuary
 Warrel Dane – vocals
 Jim Sheppard – bass
 Lenny Rutledge – guitar
 Sean Blosl – guitar
 Dave Budbill – drums
 Rich Furtner – bass (3, 7)

Technical
 Paul Chrisman – engineering (1–2, 4–6, 8–9)
 Mike Tortorello – engineering (3, 7)
 Stuart Hallerman – digital restoring
 Zeuss – mastering, restoring, mixing
 Ed Repka – cover illustration
 Nora Dirkling – layout
 Matt Akana – additional layout

Charts

References

2017 albums
Sanctuary (band) albums
Century Media Records albums